Lipostratia is a genus of beetles in the family Carabidae, containing the following species:

 Lipostratia cyaniventris Fairmaire, 1888
 Lipostratia dichroa (Chaudoir, 1848)
 Lipostratia distinguenda Fairmaire, 1886
 Lipostratia elongata (Boheman, 1848)
 Lipostratia laeviceps Basilewsky, 1964
 Lipostratia masaica Basilewsky, 1964
 Lipostratia mouffleti Chaudoir, 1872
 Lipostratia nobilis (Peringuey, 1896)
 Lipostratia somalica Basilewsky, 1960

References

Lebiinae